A four-part referendum was held in Ukraine on 16 April 2000. The referendum was called by President Leonid Kuchma, and asked voters whether they approved of four amendments to the constitution that would increase the powers of the President and introduce an upper chamber.

Although all four were approved by wide margins, the changes were never implemented by the Verkhovna Rada on the basis that the referendum was unconstitutional, as it had not passed the proposals before they went to a referendum. The Venice Commission that reviewed the case confirmed the questionable nature of the referendum that should be reviewed by the Constitutional Court of Ukraine.

Conduct
According to historian Serhy Yekelchyk President Kuchma's administration "employed electoral fraud freely" during the referendum.

Results

Question I

Question II

Question III

Question IV

See also
Ukraine without Kuchma - a protest campaign partially provoked by the unpopular referendum

References

External links
2000 Referendum Central Election Commission of Ukraine  
 Constitutional Referendum in Ukraine (2000) Venice Commission 

Referendums in Ukraine
2000 referendums
National referendum, 2000
History of Ukraine since 1991
Constitutional referendums
April 2000 events in Ukraine